Calloides nobilis is a species of beetle in the family Cerambycidae. It was described by Harris in 1837.

References

Clytini
Beetles described in 1837